is a Japanese politician who currently serves as the Minister of Defense of Japan since August 2022, previously serving from 2008 to 2009. A member of the Liberal Democratic Party, he also serves in the House of Representatives, having taken office in 1993.

In September 2008, under the Cabinet of Prime Minister Tarō Asō, Hamada was appointed as Minister of Defense. This was Hamada's first Cabinet position. He was appointed to the same position under the Cabinet of Prime Minister Fumio Kishida in 2022.

References

External links 

  in Japanese.

|-

Members of the House of Representatives (Japan)
Living people
1955 births
Politicians from Chiba Prefecture
Japanese defense ministers
Liberal Democratic Party (Japan) politicians
Senshu University alumni
21st-century Japanese politicians